The Alhambra Theatre, also known as the Palace Theatre, is a building in El Paso, Texas. Opened on August 1 1914, the building was designed by architect Henry C. Trost in the Spanish Colonial Revival style with a Moorish theme, preceding spread of the Moorish Revival style of the 1920s. The building cost $150,000.  It was prepared to serve either as a playhouse for live theater or as a movie house, and included a large organ to be played with silent movies of the day.

See also

National Register of Historic Places listings in El Paso County, Texas

References

Buildings and structures in El Paso, Texas
National Register of Historic Places in El Paso County, Texas
Theatres completed in 1914
Theatres on the National Register of Historic Places in Texas